Fernando Maturana Barahona was the 13th Mayor of the commune of Pichilemu, office which he held between November 1930 and October 1932, under Presidents Carlos Ibáñez del Campo and Juan Esteban Montero Rodríguez.

Political career
Maturana was appointed mayor of Pichilemu by decree of President Carlos Ibáñez del Campo on 27 November 1930. Along with him, Pedro Pulgar Gómez and Basiliano Leyton Pavez were appointed as vocales. Maturana's term lasted until 16 October 1932.

References

Year of birth missing
Year of death missing
Mayors of Pichilemu